Jordi Puntí i Garriga (born 1967 in Manlleu, Barcelona) is a Catalan language writer, columnist, and translator.

Career 

Punti earned a degree in Romance Philology during the year 1991, and has since worked for various publishers (Edicions 62, Quaderns Crema, Columna Edicions) across various media (El País, El Periódico de Catalunya)

His career as an author began with the publication of two books of short stories: Pell d'Armadillo (1988, winner of the Premi de la Crítica Serra d'Or), and Animals tristos (2002). Previously, he had translated the works of other authors, including Paul Auster, Daniel Pennac, and Amélie Nothomb. In 2006, Punti served as editor of Quadern, a literary supplement published by the newspaper El País.

In 2010, Puntí published Maletes perdudes, which received several awards (Crítica de la narrativa catalana, Lletra d'Or, Premi Llibreter) and has been translated to 16 languages. In 2011, he published Els Castellans, a volume that includes articles previously published in the Catalan magazine L'Avenç.

In 2006, Ventura Pons directed the film Wounded Animals, adapted from Punti's book Animals tristos (Sad Animals). In 2014, Punti received a scholarship from the Cullman Center for writers. The scholarship enabled him to spend one year completing research at the New York Public Library, in preparation for a novel based on the figure of Xavier Cugat.

Published work

Original works 
 Pell d'armadillo, (Barcelona: La Magrana), 1988. 
 Animals tristos, (Barcelona: Empúries), 2002. 
 Maletes perdudes, Barcelona: Empúries, 2010.  - translated as Lost luggage, Short Books, 2014. 
 Els Castellans, (Barcelona : L'Avenç), 2011. 
This is not America (2017)

Translations 
 Daniel Pennac, Senyors nens. Barcelona : Empúries, 1998.
 Amélie Nothomb, Higiene de l'assassí. Barcelona : Columna, 1998.
 Paul Auster, Lulu on the bridge. Barcelona : Edicions 62, 1998.
 Paul Auster, Història de la meva màquina d'escriure. Barcelona : Edicions 62, 2002.

References

External links
 

Novelists from Catalonia
21st-century novelists
People from Osona
Catalan-language writers
Translators from Catalonia
English–Catalan translators
21st-century translators
1967 births
Living people
Male novelists
21st-century male writers